The 1988 Arizona State Sun Devils baseball team represented Arizona State University in the 1988 NCAA Division I baseball season. The Sun Devils played their home games at Packard Stadium. The team was coached by Jim Brock in his sixteenth season at Arizona State.

The Sun Devils reached the College World Series, finishing as the runner up to Stanford.

Roster

Schedule

References 

Arizona State
Arizona State Sun Devils baseball seasons
College World Series seasons
Pac-12 Conference baseball champion seasons
Arizona State